The album of Muḥammad Siyāh Qalam or Siāh-Qalam comprise around 80 extant late 14th and early 15th century paintings folios, ink drawings (qalam-siāhi), and calligraphies, on various material, sometimes silk. The albums that contains these paintings, most of which are signed as Mehmet or Muhammad Siyah Qalam, is called the Fatih. These paintings depict cultural and religious ritual norms of the time period, providing insight into the demographics of that era as well as the geography.  Measuring up to 335 × 485 cm, these paintings are generally attributed to Iran and bear the strong influence of Chinese art and techniques, as well as symbols of Buddhism and Shamanism, which were both major faiths in the region of Central Asia before the arrival of Islam.

In tone and theme, the images are a highpoint of Persian draughtsmanship and include works from the Mozaffarid, Jalāyerid and Turkmen periods. They are sometimes attributed to the notname Ustad Siyah Qalam; equivalent in English to the Master of the Black Pen. There had been conflicting opinions about whether Siyah Qalam was an individual or a group of artists. This discourse arose because the artwork was done in a non-cohesive style with the name "Siyah Qalam" written and placed differently on each art piece. 

The figures depicted in the paintings span a variety of cultures: Iranian, Turkic, Chinese, Mongolic, and date to the century after reign of the Turco-Mongol conqueror Timur. Notable for their intrinsic quality, they contain depictions of diabolic imagery, everyday nomadic life in the Euroasian steppe, and contemporary culture's relationship with the dead.

They are held at the Topkapi Saray Library, Istanbul; parts of the Diez Albums of the Berlin State Library are closely related.

Muhammad Siyah Qalam 
Originally, the album paintings and drawings within this collection were attributed to the name of Muhammad Siyah Qalam. The works bear either hastily written jottings or elegant nastaliq attributions to the name, with some including the title of Ustad or “the Master,” showing that the artist held some status.

Identifying the notname has led to debate, with some associating Muhammad Siyah Qalam with a Herat painter, Hajji Muhammad. Others have identified Yaqub Beg’s court painters, Shaykhi and Darvish Muhammad, as contributors to the collection alongside Muhammad Siyah Qalam, while some suggest Darvish Muhammad and Muhammad Siyah Qalam may be one and the same. However, a broad scholarly consensus has formed around the idea that the paintings are likely the work of numerous individuals.

Subject Matter

Within the collection, there are depictions of demons, monsters, camp life, animals, fairy-like beings, and human figures in Chinese and Mongolian clothing. Alongside figural depictions are also details of nature (such as rocks and trees) which recur in Turkman court paintings of the Yaqub Beg period. 

The more fantastical and intensely coloured images seem to conjure the devastation and bleakness of Genghis Khan's reign. The images contain dark colors, heavy lines, and highly animated figures against a blank background using unsized, unpolished paper and a limited range of colors.

The compositions are highly expressive, and a number of figures are engaged in ecstatic ritual or dance. The fantastical monsters are drawn from local Pre-Islamic Central Asian folklore, bearing resemblance to beings of Indian, Chinese and middle Eastern legend as Central Asia lies on the cultural crossroad between the Middle East, South Asia and East Asia. Many of the earthly scenes depict everyday life in the Central Asian Steppes as lived by various ethnic people, most prominent the Turkic and Iranian; washing clothes, blowing fire on a cooker, hanging lines of bows and arrows. Furthermore, a drawing in the Siyah Qalam collection seems to be an adaptation of a European painting of Hercules strangling a lion. The living wear various head-dress and costumes and carry a variety of tools and weapons, and engage in different rituals.

It is commonly agreed upon by scholars that the illustrations were originally connected in a certain sequence belonging to a scroll and were possibly accompanied by narration when being presented. Experts have examined the paintings and determined that they have been cut from one scroll and reattached haphazardly.

Several features in the illustrations are linked to Jalāyirid painting in particular to the Great Jalāyirid Šāhnāma, an unfinished manuscript with illustrations that are also scattered throughout multiple albums. The miniatures were influenced by Chinese art, both in their sinuous lines and fluid rhythms, and in the figure's dress in that country's traditional dress. The works are of historical interest because of their depictions of everyday life of the faded world of historic Central Asia; with descriptions of tools, costumes, rituals, headdress, and the treatment of domesticated animals.

The cultic acts, especially the ecstatic movement of the dancing figures, filled with emotion and vehement gestures display winding and twisted limb motifs that are also seen in Buddhist and Islamic paintings.

Iconography 
The sources for the drawings are uncertain; various parts may be influenced by the Shahnameh and the biblical Solomon. Other drawings made against blank backgrounds (such as the encampment) may at first seem to be parts of a coherent series, but at further glance could be individual studies. In addition, given their often disparate size; their precise function cannot be determined with much certainty, though it might be that they were intended as aids to storytelling, to Royal elites.

The paintings of demons (or div) are mostly contained in album H. 2153, these demons are often depicted performing human actions such as sawing trees, drinking, and playing musical instruments. The demons are semi-naked, often wearing short skirts and barefoot, with some having long scarves over their shoulders. Some have argued that the accessories these demons wear are necklaces, earrings, pendants, or wrist and ankle bracelets, show a relation to Sufism, perhaps making the works a critique of Sufis during a historical period of political turmoil, uncertainty, and changes of power.

The choice of exhibiting demons throughout the paintings was for them to appear as negative entities that instill danger to the community. Influences of the Shahnameh and the biblical Solomon alluded to the North as the domain for demons, with Siyah Qalam suggesting that there was a connection to the Sufis (who progressed from the north).

Provenance
Muhammad Siyah Qalam is believed to have lived somewhere in the Qipchaq steppe, either in Moghulistan, Turkestan, or Eastern Anatolia. Siyah Qalam’s paintings, with their strange iconography, were directly impacted from the environmental space the artist was surrounded with. The influence for Siyah Qalam’s paintings could include aspects of Turkmen, Chinese, Persian, and Mongolian culture, indicating an eastern provenance. Despite speculation about the life and work of the painter, or painters, who painted in this style, the aesthetic and inspiration certainly originates from the various schools of painting most recognizable from the region of Central or Southwest Asia.

The extant leaves are taken from a number of scrolls that transferred ownership during wars and land occupations. The extant leaves are recorded in inventories in Istanbul and in the library of Topkapi palace of Sultan Selim I as treasure from his 1514 Persian adventure.

In 1910, Siyah Qalam's paintings were displayed in an exhibition of Islamic art in Munich. Since that exhibition, various scholars have attempted to geographically and historically pinpoint when and where the artist surfaced, with a variety of viewpoints being advanced.

Gallery

References

Notes

Sources
 Bloom, Jonathan, Blair, Sheila (eds). Grove Encyclopedia of Islamic Art & Architecture. Oxford: Oxford University Press, 2009.  
 Robinson, B.W. Persian Book of Kings: An Epitome of the Shahnama of Firdaws. Routledge, 2012.  
 Walther, Ingo. Codices Illustres. Berlin: Taschen Verlag, 2001. 
 L’Asie des Tartares. Rencontre avec Siyah Qalem , photographies de Roland et Sabrina Michaud, introduction de Thierry Zarcone, Gallimard, 2011
 Mazhar Ipsiroglu, Siyah Qalem , Ed. Akademische Druck, Graz, 1976.
 Ben Mehmed Siyah Kalem, Master of Humans and Demons , Ed. Yapi Kredi, Istanbul, 2004
 Robinson, B.W. 1980. "Siyah Qalam". Between China and Iran. 62-65.
 Togan, Zeki V. 30 June 1963. On the Miniatures in Istanbul Libraries. Istanbul University Press.
 B. O’Kane, “Siyah Qalam: The Jalayirid Connections,” Oriental Art 48/2, 2003a, pp. 2-18.
 Shams, Elham, and Farzaneh Farrokhfar. 2020. “Sufis or Demons: Looking at the Social Context of Siyah Qalam’s Paintings,” The Medieval History Journal. 23, pp. 102-143.
 Canby, Sheila R. ‘Siyāh-Ḳalem’. Encyclopaedia of Islam, Second Edition. Ed. P. Bearman et al. Brill Reference Online. Web. 21 Nov. 2022.
 Sahiner, Rifat. “I, Mehmet Siyah Kalem, Master of Humans and Demons Articles on Siyah Kalem’s Miniatures by Ten Authors ekrem isin et al.” Art book (London, England) 14.4 (2007): 34-34. 
 Gertsman, Elina, and Barbara H. Rosenwein. “Demon in Chains, Illustrated Single Page Manuscript, c. 1453, Style of Muhammad Siyah Qalam (Iran?), Opaque Watercolor and Gold on Paper; 25.70 × 34.40 Cm (10 1/16 × 13 1/2 Inches).” The Middle Ages in 50 Objects, 2018, pp. 100–04, https://doi.org/10.1017/9781316577189.026.
 Jale Nejdet Erzen. “Mehmet the Black Pen.” The Journal of Asian Arts ＆ Aesthetics, no. 6, 2020, https://doi.org/10.6280/JAAA.202005_(6).0008.
 Çağman, Filiz. “Glimpses into the Fourteenth-Century Turkic World of Central Asia: The Paintings of Muhammad Siyah Qalam.” In Turks: Journey of a Thousand Years, edited by Roxburgh, David J., 148–189. London: Royal Academy of Arts, 2005.

Central Asian culture
Islamic illuminated manuscripts
Turkic culture
Iranian art